This is a list of electricity-generating power stations in the U.S. state of New Hampshire, sorted by type and name. In 2020, New Hampshire had a total summer capacity of 4,478 MW through all of its power plants, and a net generation of 16,351 GWh. The corresponding electrical energy generation mix in 2021 was 56.5% nuclear, 25.6% natural gas, 6.7% hydroelectric, 5.9% biomass, 2.9% wind, 1.6% coal, 0.4% petroleum, and 0.3% non-biogenic waste.

During 2019, New Hampshire had two of the three coal power plants, and one of two nuclear power plants operating in New England. More electricity was generated than was consumed in-state. Renewables sources generated 17% of all electrical energy from New Hampshire. Wind generated more electricity than coal for the first time in 2016, while the state did not yet host a utility-scale (larger than 1 MW) solar power plant as of 2019. Smaller-scale solar, which includes customer-owned photovoltaic panels, nevertheless delivered an additional net 193 GWh to New Hampshire's electrical grid.

Nuclear power stations

Fossil-fuel power stations
Data from the U.S. Energy Information Administration serves as a general reference.

Coal-fired
 
 Schiller Units 1 & 2 operated in binary mercury-steam Rankine cycle configuration which was an early type of combined cycle configuration.

Natural gas-fired

Petroleum-fired

Renewable power stations
Data from the U.S. Energy Information Administration serves as a general reference.

Biomass and Municipal Waste

Hydroelectric

Wind

Solar

Storage power stations
New Hampshire had no utility-scale battery or pumped-storage facilities in 2019.

References

Lists of buildings and structures in New Hampshire
 
New Hampshire
Energy in New Hampshire